Celestynów  is a village in Otwock County, Masovian Voivodeship, in east-central Poland. It is the seat of the gmina (administrative district) called Gmina Celestynów.

The village has a population of 4,000.

External links
 Jewish Community in Celestynów on Virtual Shtetl

References

Villages in Otwock County
Warsaw Governorate
Warsaw Voivodeship (1919–1939)